Minissha Lamba (born 18 January 1985) is an Indian actress and poker player who appeared in Hindi films. She made her debut with Yahaan (2005). Her other notable films include Honeymoon Travels Pvt. Ltd. (2007), Bachna Ae Haseeno (2008), Well Done Abba (2010), and Bheja Fry 2 (2011).

In 2014 she participated in Colors TV's Bigg Boss 8.

Early life
Minisha Lamba was born into a Punjabi Sikh family, to Kawel Lamba and Manju Lamba in New Delhi in 1985.

She studied at Chettinad Vidyashram School, Chennai for a year and then shifted to Army Public School, Srinagar where she completed her schooling. She majored in English (Hons.) from Miranda House, University of Delhi.

Career
While studying at Delhi University, Lamba began to model for ad campaigns like LG, Sony, Cadbury, Hajmola, Airtel, Sunsilk etc. She was also a part of the Femina's Generation "W" ad. During an ad shoot for Cadbury she was approached by Bollywood director, Shoojit Sircar, who signed her to act in his film Yahaan (2005). She had begun filming for Yahaan while still in Miranda House college. She subsequently began to play supporting and then leading roles in films such as Corporate, Rocky: The Rebel, Anthony Kaun Hai, Honeymoon Travels Pvt. Ltd., Anamika, Shaurya and Dus Kahaniyaan.

In 2008, she acted in Bachna Ae Haseeno, her biggest success so far, which was produced by Yash Raj Films. Same year, she was noticed for her role in Sanjay Gadhvi's  Kidnap. Her next major role was in the critically acclaimed director  Shyam Benegal's film Well Done Abba (2010). "Well Done Abba" was awarded the  National Film Award for Best Film on Social Issues for the year 2010 and Minissha's performance as Muskaan Ali was appreciated. In 2014, she participated in Colors TV's Bigg Boss 8. She got evicted after 6 weeks on 2 November 2014 (Day 42). One of her last appearances was a role in Double Di Trouble, alongside Dharmendra, Gippy Grewal, Gurpreet Ghuggi, Kulraj Randhawa, and Poonam Dhillon. She has also appeared in the music video for Himesh Reshammiya's song "Tera Surroor" from the album Aap Kaa Surroor, which became very popular.

Personal life
Lamba married Ryan Tham - a restaurateur, owner of Juhu nightclub "Trilogy", and cousin to actress Pooja Bedi, on 6 July 2015. They announced the finalisation of their divorce proceedings in August 2020. In July 2021, she made her relationship with businessman Akash Malik public.

Filmography

Television

References

External links

 
 
 
 
 
 

1985 births
Living people
Punjabi people
Indian Sikhs
Indian film actresses
Actresses in Hindi cinema
Female models from Delhi
Delhi University alumni
Actresses from New Delhi
Bigg Boss (Hindi TV series) contestants
Actresses in Punjabi cinema